M. Sivaperuman is an Indian politician and former Member of the Legislative Assembly of Tamil Nadu. He was elected twice to the Tamil Nadu legislative assembly from Omalur constituency as an Anna Dravida Munnetra Kazhagam candidate in 1977, and 1980 elections. As a cadre of AIADMK party, he also served as a District Panchayat Chairman of Salem District from 2001 to 2006.

References 

All India Anna Dravida Munnetra Kazhagam politicians
Living people
1934 births
Tamil Nadu MLAs 1977–1980
Tamil Nadu MLAs 1980–1984